Gasteria glauca, the Kouga gasteria, is a succulent plant, native to the cliffs above the Kouga river, in the Eastern Cape, South Africa.

It has thick fleshy bluish ("glaucous") leaves which are distichous in young plants, but soon become a dense rosette. These smooth shiny green leaves are nearly cylindrical with a pointy tip.

The fleshy leaves have a velvety texture and are heart-shaped, long.

The stamens are spirally arranged, are long, and are enclosed in filaments which are partially inserted in the central vein. It is the distinctive grey-green colour of the leaves, which are often sharply pointed, which distinguishes it from the other gasterias.

It is most closely related to the species Gasteria ellaphieae, and also to Gasteria vlokii and Gasteria nitida.  The flowers of all four species are also almost identical.

References

Flora of the Cape Provinces
glauca